Harold Godwinson ( – 14 October 1066), also called Harold II, was the last crowned Anglo-Saxon English king. Harold reigned from 6 January 1066 until his death at the Battle of Hastings, fighting the Norman invaders led by William the Conqueror during the Norman conquest of England. His death marked the end of Anglo-Saxon rule over England.

Harold Godwinson was a member of a prominent Anglo-Saxon family with ties to Cnut the Great. He became a powerful earl after the death of his father, Godwin, Earl of Wessex. After his brother-in-law, King Edward the Confessor, died without an heir on 5 January 1066, the Witenagemot convened and chose Harold to succeed him; he was probably the first English monarch to be crowned in Westminster Abbey. In late September, he successfully repelled an invasion by rival claimant Harald Hardrada of Norway in York before marching his army back south to meet William the Conqueror at Hastings two weeks later.

Family background

Harold was a son of Godwin (–1053), the powerful earl of Wessex, and of Gytha Thorkelsdóttir, whose brother Ulf the Earl was married to Estrid Svendsdatter (c. 1015/1016), the daughter of King Sweyn Forkbeard (died 1014) and sister of King Cnut the Great of England and Denmark. Ulf and Estrid's son would become King Sweyn II of Denmark in 1047. Godwin was the son of Wulfnoth, probably a thegn and a native of Sussex. Godwin began his political career by supporting King Edmund Ironside (reigned April to November 1016), but switched to supporting King Cnut by 1018, when Cnut named him Earl of Wessex. Godwin remained an earl throughout the remainder of Cnut's reign, one of only two earls to survive to the end of that reign. On Cnut's death in 1035, Godwin originally supported Harthacnut instead of Cnut's initial successor Harold Harefoot, but managed to switch sides in 1037—although not without becoming involved in the 1036 murder of Alfred Aetheling, half-brother of Harthacnut and younger brother of the later King Edward the Confessor. When Harold Harefoot died in 1040, Harthacnut ascended the English throne and Godwin's power was imperiled by his earlier involvement in Alfred's murder, but an oath and large gift secured the new king's favour for Godwin. Harthacnut's death in 1042 probably involved Godwin in a role as kingmaker, helping to secure the English throne for Edward the Confessor. In 1045 Godwin reached the height of his power when the new king married Godwin's daughter Edith.
Godwin and Gytha had several children—six sons: Sweyn, Harold, Tostig, Gyrth, Leofwine and Wulfnoth (in that order); and three daughters: Edith of Wessex (originally named Gytha but renamed Ealdgyth (or Edith) when she married King Edward the Confessor), Gunhild and Ælfgifu. The birthdates of the children are unknown. Harold was aged about 25 in 1045, which makes his birth year around 1020.

Powerful nobleman
Edith married Edward on 23 January 1045 and, around that time, Harold became Earl of East Anglia. Harold is called "earl" when he appears as a witness in a will that may date to 1044; but, by 1045, Harold regularly appears as an earl in documents. One reason for his appointment to East Anglia may have been a need to defend against the threat from King Magnus the Good of Norway. It is possible that Harold led some of the ships from his earldom that were sent to Sandwich in 1045 against Magnus. Sweyn, Harold's elder brother, had been named an earl in 1043. It was also around the time that Harold was named an earl that he began a relationship with Edith the Fair, who appears to have been the heiress to lands in Cambridgeshire, Suffolk and Essex, lands in Harold's new earldom. The relationship was a form of marriage that was not blessed or sanctioned by the Church, known as More danico, or "in the Danish manner", and was accepted by most laypeople in England at the time. Any children of such a union were considered legitimate. Harold probably entered the relationship in part to secure support in his new earldom.

Harold's elder brother Sweyn was exiled in 1047 after abducting the abbess of Leominster. Sweyn's lands were divided between Harold and a cousin, Beorn. In 1049, Harold was in command of a ship or ships that were sent with a fleet to aid Henry III, Holy Roman Emperor against Baldwin V, Count of Flanders, who was in revolt against Henry. During this campaign, Sweyn returned to England and attempted to secure a pardon from the king, but Harold and Beorn refused to return any of their lands, and Sweyn, after leaving the royal court, took Beorn hostage and later killed him.

In 1051 Edward appointed an enemy of the Godwins as Archbishop of Canterbury and soon afterwards drove them into exile, but they raised an army which forced the king to restore them to their positions a year later. Earl Godwin died in 1053, and Harold succeeded him as Earl of Wessex, which made him the most powerful lay figure in England after the king.

In 1055 Harold drove back the Welsh, who had burned Hereford. Harold also became Earl of Hereford in 1058, and replaced his late father as the focus of opposition to growing Norman influence in England under the restored monarchy (1042–66) of Edward the Confessor, who had spent more than 25 years in exile in Normandy. He led a series of successful campaigns (1062–63) against Gruffydd ap Llywelyn of Gwynedd, king of Wales. This conflict ended with Gruffydd's defeat and death in 1063.

Harold in northern France

In 1064, Harold was apparently shipwrecked at Ponthieu. There is much speculation about this voyage. The earliest post-conquest Norman chroniclers report that King Edward had previously sent Robert of Jumièges, the archbishop of Canterbury, to appoint as his heir Edward's maternal kinsman, Duke William II of Normandy, and that at this later date Harold was sent to swear fealty. Scholars disagree as to the reliability of this story. William, at least, seems to have believed he had been offered the succession, but there must have been some confusion either on William's part or perhaps by both men, since the English succession was neither inherited nor determined by the reigning monarch. Instead the Witenagemot, the assembly of the kingdom's leading notables, would convene after a king's death to select a successor. Other acts of Edward are inconsistent with his having made such a promise, such as his efforts to return his nephew Edward the Exile, son of King Edmund Ironside, from Hungary in 1057. Later Norman chroniclers suggest alternative explanations for Harold's journey: that he was seeking the release of members of his family who had been held hostage since Godwin's exile in 1051, or even that he had simply been travelling along the English coast on a hunting and fishing expedition and had been driven across the Channel by an unexpected storm. There is general agreement that he left from Bosham, and was blown off course, landing at Ponthieu. He was captured by Count Guy I of Ponthieu, and was then taken as a hostage to the count's castle at Beaurain,  up the River Canche from its mouth at what is now Le Touquet. William arrived soon afterward and ordered Guy to turn Harold over to him. Harold then apparently accompanied William to battle against William's enemy, Conan II, Duke of Brittany. While crossing into Brittany past the fortified abbey of Mont Saint-Michel, Harold is recorded as rescuing two of William's soldiers from quicksand. They pursued Conan from Dol-de-Bretagne to Rennes, and finally to Dinan, where he surrendered the fortress's keys at the point of a lance. William presented Harold with weapons and arms, knighting him. The Bayeux Tapestry, and other Norman sources, then record that Harold swore an oath on sacred relics to William to support his claim to the English throne. After Edward's death, the Normans were quick to point out that in accepting the crown of England, Harold had broken this alleged oath.

The chronicler Orderic Vitalis wrote of Harold that he "was distinguished by his great size and strength of body, his polished manners, his firmness of mind and command of words, by a ready wit and a variety of excellent qualities. But what availed so many valuable gifts, when good faith, the foundation of all virtues, was wanting?"

Due to a doubling of taxation by Tostig in 1065 that threatened to plunge England into civil war, Harold supported Northumbrian rebels against his brother, and replaced him with Morcar. This led to Harold's marriage alliance with the northern earls but fatally split his own family, driving Tostig into alliance with King Harald Hardrada ("Hard Ruler") of Norway.

Reign 

At the end of 1065, King Edward the Confessor fell into a coma without clarifying his preference for the succession. He died on 5 January 1066, according to the Vita Ædwardi Regis, but not before briefly regaining consciousness and commending his widow and the kingdom to Harold's "protection". The intent of this charge remains ambiguous, as is the Bayeux Tapestry, which simply depicts Edward pointing at a man thought to represent Harold. When the Witan convened the next day they selected Harold to succeed, and his coronation followed on 6 January, most likely held in Westminster Abbey, though no evidence from the time survives to confirm this. Although later Norman sources point to the suddenness of this coronation, the reason may have been that all the nobles of the land were present at Westminster for the feast of Epiphany, and not because of any usurpation of the throne on Harold's part.

In early January 1066, upon hearing of Harold's coronation, William began plans to invade England, building 700 warships and transports at Dives-sur-Mer on the Normandy coast. Initially, William struggled to gain support for his cause, however, after claiming that Harold had broken an oath sworn on sacred relics, the Pope formally declared William the rightful heir of the throne of England and nobles flocked to his cause. In preparation of the invasion, Harold assembled his troops on the Isle of Wight, but the invasion fleet remained in port for almost seven months, perhaps due to unfavourable winds. On 8 September, with provisions running out, Harold disbanded his army and returned to London. On the same day, the invasion force of Harald Hardrada,  accompanied by Tostig, landed at the mouth of the Tyne.

The invading forces of Hardrada and Tostig defeated the English earls Edwin of Mercia and Morcar of Northumbria at the Battle of Fulford near York on 20 September 1066. Harold led his army north on a forced march from London, reached Yorkshire in four days, and caught Hardrada by surprise. On 25 September, in the Battle of Stamford Bridge, Harold defeated Hardrada and Tostig, who were both killed.

According to Snorri Sturluson, in a story described by Edward Freeman as "plainly mythical", before the battle a single man rode up alone to Harald Hardrada and Tostig. He gave no name, but spoke to Tostig, offering the return of his earldom if he would turn against Hardrada. Tostig asked what his brother Harold would be willing to give Hardrada for his trouble. The rider replied "Seven feet of English ground, as he is taller than other men." Then he rode back to the Saxon host. Hardrada was impressed by the rider's boldness, and asked Tostig who he was. Tostig replied that the rider was Harold Godwinson himself.

Battle of Hastings

On 12 September 1066 William's fleet sailed from Normandy. Several ships sank in storms, which forced the fleet to take shelter at Saint-Valery-sur-Somme and to wait for the wind to change. On 27 September the Norman fleet set sail for England, arriving the following day at Pevensey on the coast of East Sussex. Harold's army marched 241 miles (386 kilometres) to intercept William, who had landed perhaps 7,000 men in Sussex, southern England. Harold established his army in hastily built earthworks near Hastings. The two armies clashed at the Battle of Hastings, at Senlac Hill (near the present town of Battle) close by Hastings on 14 October, where after nine hours of hard fighting, Harold was killed and his forces defeated. His brothers Gyrth and Leofwine were also killed in the battle, according to the Anglo-Saxon Chronicle.

Death
The notion that Harold died by an arrow to the eye is a popular belief today, but this historical legend is subject to much scholarly debate. A Norman account of the battle, Carmen de Hastingae Proelio ("Song of the Battle of Hastings"), said to have been written shortly after the battle by Guy, Bishop of Amiens, says that Harold was killed by four knights, probably including Duke William, and his body dismembered. Twelfth-century Anglo-Norman histories, such as William of Malmesbury's Gesta Regum Anglorum and Henry of Huntingdon's Historia Anglorum recount that Harold died by an arrow wound to his head. An earlier source, Amatus of Montecassino's L'Ystoire de li Normant ("History of the Normans"), written only twenty years after the battle of Hastings, contains a report of Harold being shot in the eye with an arrow, but this may be an early fourteenth-century addition. Later accounts reflect one or both of these two versions.

A figure in the panel of the Bayeux Tapestry with the inscription "Hic Harold Rex Interfectus Est" ("Here King Harold is killed") is depicted gripping an arrow that has struck his eye, but some historians have questioned whether this man is intended to be Harold or if Harold is intended as the next figure lying to the right almost supine, being mutilated beneath a horse's hooves. Etchings made of the Tapestry in the 1730s show the standing figure with differing objects. Benoît's 1729 sketch shows only a dotted line indicating stitch marks without any indication of fletching, whereas all other arrows in the Tapestry are fletched. Bernard de Montfaucon's 1730 engraving has a solid line resembling a spear being held overhand matching the manner of the figure to the left. Stothard's 1819 water-colour drawing has, for the first time, a fletched arrow in the figure's eye. Although not apparent in the earlier depictions, the Tapestry today has stitch marks indicating the fallen figure once had an arrow in its eye. It has been proposed that the second figure once had an arrow added by over-enthusiastic nineteenth-century restorers that was later unstitched. Many believe this, as the name "Harold" is above the figure with an arrow in his eye. This has been disputed by examining other examples from the Tapestry where the visual centre of a scene, not the location of the inscription, identifies named figures. Further evidence is that an arrow volley would be loosed before the Norman cavalry charge. A further suggestion is that both accounts are accurate, and that Harold suffered first the eye wound, then the mutilation, and the Tapestry is depicting both in sequence.

Burial and legacy

The account of the contemporary chronicler William of Poitiers states that the body of Harold was given to William Malet for burial:

Another source states that Harold's widow, Edith Swannesha, was called to identify the body, which she did by some private mark known only to her. Harold's strong association with Bosham, his birthplace, and the discovery in 1954 of an Anglo-Saxon coffin in the church there, has led some to suggest it as the place of King Harold's burial. A request to exhume a grave in Bosham Church was refused by the Diocese of Chichester in December 2003, the Chancellor having ruled that the chances of establishing the identity of the body as Harold's were too slim to justify disturbing a burial place. A prior exhumation had revealed the remains of a man, estimated at up to 60 years of age from photographs of the remains, lacking a head, one leg and the lower part of his other leg, a description consistent with the fate of the king as recorded in the Carmen. The poem also claims Harold was buried by the sea, which is consistent with William of Poitiers' account and with the identification of the grave at Bosham Church that is only yards from Chichester Harbour and in sight of the English Channel.

There were legends of Harold's body being given a proper funeral years later in his church at Waltham Holy Cross in Essex, which he had refounded in 1060. Legends also grew up that Harold had not died at Hastings but instead fled England or that he later ended his life as a hermit at Chester or Canterbury.

Harold's son Ulf, along with Morcar and two others, were released from prison by King William as he lay dying in 1087. Ulf threw his lot in with Robert Curthose, who knighted him, and then disappeared from history. Two of Harold's other sons, Godwine and Edmund, invaded England in 1068 and 1069 with the aid of Diarmait mac Máel na mBó (High King of Ireland) but were defeated at the Battle of Northam. In 1068, Diarmait presented another Irish king with Harold's battle standard.

Marriages and children

For some twenty years Harold was married more danico (Latin: "in the Danish manner") to Edith the Fair (also known as Edith Swanneck) and had at least six children with her. She was considered Harold's mistress by the clergy.

According to Orderic Vitalis, Harold was at some time betrothed to Adeliza, a daughter of William the Conqueror; if so, the betrothal never led to marriage.

About January 1066, Harold married Edith (or Ealdgyth), daughter of Ælfgar, Earl of Mercia, and widow of the Welsh prince Gruffydd ap Llywelyn. She had one son, named Harold, probably born posthumously. Another of Harold's sons, Ulf, may have been a twin of the younger Harold, though most historians consider him a son of Edith the Fair. Both these sons survived into adulthood and probably lived out their lives in exile.

After her husband's death, Edith fled for refuge to her brothers, Edwin, Earl of Mercia and Morcar of Northumbria, but both men made their peace with King William initially before rebelling and losing their lands and lives. Edith may have fled abroad (possibly with Harold's mother, Gytha, or with Harold's daughter, Gytha). Harold's sons, Godwin and Edmund, fled to Ireland and then invaded Devon, but were defeated by Brian of Brittany.

Family tree

References

Notes

Citations

Sources

 
 
 
 
 
 
 
 
 
 
 
 
 
 
 
 
 
 
 
 William of Poitiers, Gesta Guillelmi II Ducis Normannorum, or "The Deeds of William II, Duke of the Normans". Quoted by David C. Douglas & George W. Greenaway (eds.), in: English Historical Documents 1042–1189, London, 1959.

Further reading

External links
 Harold II at the official website of the British monarchy
 
 BBC Historic Figures: Harold II (Godwineson) (c. 1020–1066)
 

|-

|-

1020s births
1066 deaths
Year of birth uncertain
11th-century English monarchs
Anglo-Norse monarchs
Anglo-Saxon people
Anglo-Saxon warriors
Anglo-Saxons killed in battle
Deaths by arrow wounds
Earls of East Anglia
Earls of Herefordshire
Earls of Wessex
English people of Danish descent
English Roman Catholics
House of Godwin
Monarchs killed in action
Monarchs of England before 1066
Norman conquest of England
People from Bosham